Carlos Bee (July 8, 1867 – April 20, 1932) was an attorney and politician, serving as  U.S. Representative from Texas. He was a son of Hamilton P. Bee and a great-grandson of Thomas Bee, a politician and judge in South Carolina in the Revolutionary and Federal periods.

Early life and education
Carlos Bee was born in 1867 in Saltillo, Mexico, where his parents Hamilton Prioleau Bee and Mildred Tarver Bee had moved from San Antonio after the collapse of the Confederacy and the end of the American Civil War. His father had been a general in the Confederate Army.

In 1874, the family returned to San Antonio when Bee was about seven years old. He attended the public schools and the Agricultural and Mechanical College. He studied law while working as a railway mail clerk. After passing the bar, he started a practice.

Career
After being admitted to the bar in 1893, Bee started a law practice in San Antonio. He joined the Democratic Party and was appointed as United States commissioner for the western district of Texas in 1893.  On January 16, 1895, Bee married Mary Kyle Burleson (December 14, 1873—April 3, 1923), who was the daughter of Emma (née Kyle) and Edward Burleson. His wife was one of the founders of the Pan-American Round Tables.

He was appointed as district attorney of the thirty-seventh judicial district, serving 1898–1905. He served as delegate to the Democratic National Convention in 1904 and 1908, and was elected as chairman in 1904. In his first electoral office, Bee served as a member of the city school board of San Antonio 1906–1908. He was appointed as president of the county school board of Bexar County, Texas from 1912 to 1914.

In 1914, Bee was elected as a member of the Texas State Senate, serving 1915–1919.

In 1918, he was elected as a Democrat to the Sixty-sixth Congress (March 4, 1919 – March 3, 1921). In 1920, he ran unsuccessfully in the primary for re-election to the Sixty-seventh Congress.

Later years
After his defeat in the primary, Bee returned to the practice of law in San Antonio. He worked there until his death there on April 20, 1932. Within a month of his death, Bee's second wife, Mary Elizabeth "Bettie Mae" (née Oliver) died on 27 May 1932. He was interred in the Confederate Cemetery. His son, Carlos Bee, was mayor of Hayward, California and served in the California State Assembly.

References

1867 births
1932 deaths
Bee family
County district attorneys in Texas
People from Saltillo
Politicians from San Antonio
School board members in Texas
Texas A&M University alumni
Democratic Party Texas state senators
Democratic Party members of the United States House of Representatives from Texas
Lawyers from San Antonio